Elner Åkesson (1890–1962) was a Swedish cinematographer who worked on more than forty-five films.

Selected filmography
 Skipper's Love (1931)
 Ship Ahoy! (1931)
 The Storholmen Brothers (1932)
 People of Hälsingland (1933)
 Boman's Boy (1933)
 The Atlantic Adventure (1934)
 The People of Småland (1935)
 Under False Flag (1935)
 He, She and the Money (1936)
 65, 66 and I (1936)
 Oh, Such a Night! (1937)
 Thunder and Lightning (1938)
 Variety Is the Spice of Life (1939)
 Oh, What a Boy! (1939)
 Only One Night (1939)
 The Crazy Family (1940)
 Only a Woman (1941)
 Dangerous Ways (1942)
 Mister Collins' Adventure (1943)
 Gentleman with a Briefcase (1943)
 We Need Each Other (1944)
Widower Jarl (1945)
 When the Meadows Blossom (1946)

References

Bibliography 
Hagener, Malte.  The Emergence of Film Culture: Knowledge Production, Institution Building, and the Fate of the Avant-garde in Europe, 1919-1945. Berghahn Books, 2014.

External links 

1890 births
1962 deaths
Swedish cinematographers
People from Stockholm